Rufus Ajileye Adepoju 
is an Anglican bishop in Nigeria: he was the  Bishop of Ekiti West. He served as a priest in the Ekiti diocese before being concentrated as bishop.

Notes

Living people
Anglican bishops of Ekiti West
21st-century Anglican bishops in Nigeria
Year of birth missing (living people)